Leucopogon corynocarpus is a small plant in the family Ericaceae and is endemic to Western Australia.  

It was first formally described in 1845 by Otto Wilhelm Sonder in Johann Georg Christian Lehmann's Plantae Preissianae. The specific epithet (corynocarpus) means "club-fruited".

References 

corynocarpus
Ericales of Australia
Flora of Western Australia
Plants described in 1845
Taxa named by Otto Wilhelm Sonder